Quintile  may refer to:

In statistics, a quantile for the case where the sample or population is divided into fifths
Quintiles, a biotechnology research company based in the United States
Quintile (astrology), a type of astrological aspect formed by a 72° angle

See also
 1/5 (disambiguation)